Walter Kerr (born 14 September 1930) is a former Scotland international rugby union player. He played as a Flanker.

Rugby union career

Amateur career

Kerr played for London Scottish.

International career

He was capped for  once in 1953. He played in the Five Nations match against England at Twickenham Stadium on 21 March that year.

References

Scottish rugby union players
Scotland international rugby union players
1930 births
London Scottish F.C. players
Rugby union flankers
Living people